John Thirkell is a British trumpet and flugelhorn player, who has appeared on hundreds of pop, rock, and jazz recordings.  Through the 1980s and early 1990s he was on at least one album in the UK Charts continuously, without a break, for over 13 years. In 2009 he had two consecutive UK No.1 singles with Pixie Lott and was the first person to be inducted into the Musician's Union "Hall of Fame." In 2022 he scored his 27th No.1 album playing on Olly Murs "Marry Me".

He is also known for playing with Level 42 in partnership with fellow Brit and saxophonist Gary Barnacle.

His other credits include work with artists such as Rod Stewart, George Michael, Lisa Stansfield, Jamiroquai, UB40, Cher, Tina Turner, Pet Shop Boys, Swing Out Sister, Spice Girls, BTS and many more, along with stints in the Buddy Rich Band and Gil Evans Orchestra. He is also the producer of covers band Red Sauce.

Credits 

Level 42 Forever Now (Resurgent) Group Member
Level 42 Guaranteed – Group Member
Jamiroquai Emergency on Planet Earth – Trumpet, Horn Arrangements
Jamiroquai Bad Girls Live – Trumpet
Jamiroquai Return of the Space Cowboy – Trumpet, Horn Arrangements
George Michael Older –  Flugelhorn, Upper Flugelhorn & Trumpet
BTS - Dynamite - Trumpet
Pixie Lott Mama Do - "Trumpet"
Pixie Lott Boys and Girls - "Trumpet"
Paul Weller On Sunset - "Trumpet, Flugelhorn"
UB40 Labour of Love II – Trumpet
Swing Out Sister Breakout – Trumpet
Swing Out Sister Surrender – Trumpet
Tina Turner Simply the Best – Trumpet
Jools Holland World of His Own – Trumpet
Phil Collins Prince's Trust Concert 1987 & 2010 – Trumpet, Flugelhorn
Status Quo Don't Stop: 30th Anniversary Album –  Trumpet, Flugelhorn
Westlife My Girl – Trumpet
Westlife What Becomes of the Broken Hearted – Trumpet
Lisa Stansfield Lisa Stansfield – Horn Arrangements, Trumpet
Lisa Stansfield Swing – Trumpet
Lisa Stansfield Seven 
Queen Princes Trust 2010 – Trumpet/Flugelhorn
Kylie Minogue Fever – Flute, Trumpet
Kylie Minogue Let's Get To It – Trumpet
Kylie Minogue Better the Devil You Know – Trumpet
Tom Jones Reload)- Flugelhorn, Trumpet
Spandau Ballet Heart Like a Sky – Trumpet, Flugelhorn
M People Bizarre Fruit – Trumpet, Flugelhorn
Prefab Sprout Jordan: The Comeback – Trumpet, Flugelhorn
Frankie Goes to Hollywood Liverpool – Trumpet, Flugelhorn
Take That Nobody Else – Trumpet
ABC Lexicon of Love – Trumpet, Flugelhorn
Roger Waters Radio Kaos – Trumpet, Flugelhorn
Bros Changing Faces – Trumpet
Eric Clapton Prince's Trust Concert 1987 & 2010 – Trumpet, Flugelhorn
Stereo MC's Connected – Trumpet
Randy Crawford Rich & Poor – Trumpet
Katrina and the Waves Walking on Sunshine – Trumpet
Natalie Imbruglia Satellite – Trumpet, Flugelhorn
Culture Club Your Kisses Are Charity – Trumpet
The Style Council Have You Ever Had It Blue – Trumpet
Lionel Richie Renaissance – Trumpet, Flugelhorn
The The Infected (Sony Reissue) – Trumpet
The The Dusk (Sony Reissue) – Trumpet
Anastacia One Day in Your Life (Import Single) – Trumpet
Cher Living Proof (Japan Bonus Track) – Flugelhorn, Trumpet
George Harrison Princes Trust Concert 1987 – Trumpet, Flugelhorn
Ringo Starr Princes Trust Concert 1987 – Trumpet, Flugelhorn
Miriam Stockley Second Nature  – Trumpet
Swing Out Sister Live at the Jazz Cafe – Flugelhorn, Trumpet
Byron Stingily Club Stories (Import Bonus Tracks) –
Culture Club Don't Mind If I Do – Trumpet
Jakko Jakszyk The Road to Ballina – Trumpet
Tom Jones Reload – Trumpet
Maxi Priest CombiNation – Trumpet
Dany Brillant Nouveau Jour – Arranger, Trumpet
Tina Turner Wildest Dreams – Trumpet
M People Fresco – Trumpet
Right Said Fred Smashing! – Trumpet
Angélique Kidjo Fifa – Trumpet
Angélique Kidjo Aye – Trumpet
Swing Out Sister Living Return – Flugelhorn, Trumpet
Pet Shop Boys Very – Conductor, Brass
Pet Shop Boys Relentless – Brass
Clive Griffin Clive Griffin – Trumpet
Swing Out Sister Get in Touch with Yourself – Flugelhorn, Trumpet
29 Palms Fatal Joy – Flugelhorn, Trumpet
The Beautiful South Welcome to the Beautiful South – Flugelhorn, Trumpet
The Beautiful South Carry On Up the Charts – Flugelhorn, Trumpet
The Sugarcubes Here Today, Tomorrow Next Week! – Trumpet
Jimmy Somerville Read My Lips – Trumpet
Tony Banks Bankstatement – Trumpet
Randy Crawford Rich and Poor – Brass
Clive Griffin Step by Step – Overdubs
Toni Childs Union – Horn
Hothouse Flowers People – Brass
Was (Not Was) What Up, Dog? – Brass, Overdubs
Grace Jones Slave to the Rhythm – Percussion, Trumpet
Elaine Paige Stages – Flugelhorn
Pixie Lott Mama Do – Trumpet
Pixie Lott Boys & Girls – Trumpet
James Morrison 'Songs For You, Truths For Me' – Trumpet & Flugelhorn
Kiri Te Kanawa 'World in Union' – Trumpet
Jamie Cullum – Princes Trust 2010
Paloma Faith – Princes Trust 2010
The Who – Hurtwood Park 2014
Jeff Beck – Hurtwood Park 2014
Bruno Mars Uptown Funk – Trumpet
The Faces – Hurtwood Park 2015
BTS Dynamite – Trumpet
Olly Murs Marry Me – Trumpet

References

External links
Official website

1958 births
British rock trumpeters
British jazz trumpeters
Male trumpeters
Flugelhorn players
Jamiroquai members
Living people
Place of birth missing (living people)